Oliver Kraus (born 1970 in Shepherd's Bush, London) is an English musician best known for his work as a cellist and string arranger/ producer and composer for film and television.

String Arrangements and Performance
Kraus has performed with numerous international artists, both on tour and in studio.  As an arranger, he has written, arranged and performed strings for many artists including:

Dave Matthews' No.1 album Come Tomorrow
Adele's No 1 Grammy-winning album 25
Beth Orton's album Trailer Park
Sia's album Some People Have Real Problems
Ash's album Free All Angels
Tom McRae, multiple albums
 Duffy's debut album, Rockferry
Christina Aguilera's No.1 album, Bionic and Golden Globe nominated song from the film Burlesque, "Bound to You" from the Burlesque soundtrack
Sara Bareilles & Ingrid Michaelson, Pink, Florence and the Machine, Colbie Caillat & Gavin Degraw, Tom McRae, Lukas Nelson, Joshua Radin, Cary Brothers, Lenka, Tracey Thorn, James Blunt, Rachael Yamagata, Jake Bugg, Paloma Faith, Joy Williams, Christina Perri, Alexi Murdoch, Jay Brannan, Ry Cuming, Bell X1, Christina Aguilera, Gomez, Dan Wilson, Colin Hay, Lifehouse, Liz Phair, Mandy Moore, Marc Almond, Meiko, My Life Story, Kristina Train, The View, The Weepies, Thea Gilmore, Priscilla Ahn, Brandon Jenner, Tyler Hilton, Hanson and Ben Ottewell, among other artists
Full Credits on Allmusic.com

Film and Television
As a composer, Kraus has written music for film and television with frequent collaboration with Sia and The Cure drummer Jason Cooper.

Film and Soundtrack
Fifty Shades Freed, dir. James Foley, Song "Helium" Produced and Arranged for Sia Furler 2018
You, Me and Gasoline  dir. Jenna A Rice, Co-written with Joel Shearer 2017
Fifty Shades Darker, dir. James Foley, Song "Deer in Headlights" Produced and Arranged for Sia Furler 2017 
Finding Dory dir. Andrew Stanton, Song "Unforgettable' Arranged, Produced and Conducted for Sia Furler 2016
Bad Santa 2 dir. Mark Waters, Song "(There's No Place Like) Home for the Holidays" Co-Produced with John Alagia, singer Joy Williams 2016
San Andreas dir. Brad Peyton, Song 'California Dreaming' Produced for Sia Furler 2015
Fifty Shades Of Grey dir. Sam Taylor-Johnson, Song 'Salted Wound' Co-Written and Produced for Sia Furler 2015
The Great Gatsby, dir. Baz Luhrmann, song Kill and Run Produced and Arranged for Sia Furler, 2013
Without Gorky dir. Cosima Spender, Score Co-Written with Jason Cooper and Matteo Cipollina 2012
Twilight Eclipse dir. David Slade, song ‘My Love’ co-written and Produced with Sia Furler, 2010
From Within, dir. Phedon Papamichael, 2008 Music Score co-written and Produced with Jason Cooper, winner of Grand Jury Award for Best Music Score at the Solstice Film Festival
Joybells, dir. Mike Hawley, Music score written and produced. 2007
Stanley, dir. Mike Hawley, Music score written and produced 2007
The Power of the Game, dir. Michael Apted, 2007 cues written for score.
Spiderhole, dir. Daniel Simpson, Music score co-written and Produced with Jason Cooper, 2009
The Uninvited, dir. Daniel Simpson, Music score co-written and Produced with Jason Cooper, 1999
‘h’ dir, Daniel Simpson, Music score co-written and Produced with Jason Cooper,  1995
Handle with Care, dir, Alexis Bowler & Sandy Hunt, WWF, Co-written with Antony Wilkins & Miriam Kaufman. Awards: Winner Best Children's Program at Chicago International Children's Film Festival; New England Children's Film festival; British Animation Week, National Film Theatre, London; Edinburgh International Film Festival

Television 
Kraus has worked with the BBC's Documentary department scoring music for a number of series including 7 episodes of BBC1's ‘Macintyre Investigates’ featuring BAFTA-nominated investigative reporter Donal Macintyre, 12 episodes of BBC1's ‘Whistleblowers’ series, and BBC1's flagship documentary series ‘Panorama’. He teamed up again with writing partner Jason Cooper to score music for the BBC Wildlife Documentary series ‘Natural World," working with Simon King on several documentary films.

Selected Credits

 Meerkats, Natural World, BBC 2, 2003
 What's the Big Idea, Series, Discovery Channel, 2004
 Cheetahs, Natural World, BBC 2, 2005
 The Battle with my Brain, Dispatches, C4,2005
 Toki's Tale, Natural World, BBC 2, 2007
 Macintyre Investigates, Series, BBC 1, 2002-3
 Whistleblowers, Series, BBC 1, 2004-6
 Dogfighting, Panorama, BBC 1, 2007

Original Composition

 Oliver Kraus, Sound Bites

Notes

References
 Twilight Eclipse, My Love Interview
 From Within Composers Award, 19–21 June 2008 in St. Paul, Minneapolis". Solstice Film Festival

External links
 
 Myspace Profile
 

1970 births
Living people
British cellists
British film score composers
British male film score composers